San Marino competed at the inaugural 7 sports 2018 European Championships which were held in Berlin, Germany and Glasgow, United Kingdom from 2 to 12 August 2018. It competed in 2 sports.

Aquatics

Swimming
A total of 6 swimmers (2 men and 4 women) represented San Marino in the swimming events.
Men

Women

Mixed events

Athletics

A total of 2 athletes (all men) represented San Marino in the athletics events.
Men
Track and road

Field events

References

External links
 European Championships official site 

2018
Nations at the 2018 European Championships